A multipoint control unit (MCU) is a device commonly used to bridge videoconferencing connections.

See also 
 H.323

Further reading

Videotelephony
Teleconferencing
Telecommunications equipment